Conus terebra is a species of sea snail, a marine gastropod mollusk in the family Conidae, the cone snails and their allies.

Like all species within the genus Conus, these snails are predatory and venomous. They are capable of "stinging" humans, therefore live ones should be handled carefully or not at all.

Description
The length of the shell varies between 43 mm and 100 mm. The shell is striated throughout. Its color is pale yellowish or ash-color, indistinctly two-banded, often somewhat tinged with violet at the base. The aperture is white or slightly violaceous.

Distribution
This marine species occurs in the Red Sea, in the tropical Indo-Pacific and off Australia (Northern Territory, Queensland and Western Australia).

References

 Born, I. von 1778. Index rerum naturalium Musei Caesarei Vindobonensis, pl. 1, Testacea. – Verzeichniss etc. Illust. Vindobonae. Vienna : J.P. Krauss xlii 458 pp.
 Gmelin J.F. 1791. Caroli a Linné. Systema Naturae per regna tria naturae, secundum classes, ordines, genera, species, cum characteribus, differentiis, synonymis, locis. Lipsiae : Georg. Emanuel. Beer Vermes. Vol. 1(Part 6) pp. 3021–3910.
 Röding, P.F. 1798. Museum Boltenianum sive Catalogus cimeliorum e tribus regnis naturae quae olim collegerat Joa. Hamburg : Trappii 199 pp. 
 Reeve, L.A. 1843. Monograph of the genus Conus. pls 1–39 in Reeve, L.A. (ed.). Conchologica Iconica. London : L. Reeve & Co. Vol. 1. 
 Hinds, R.B. 1843. Description of new shells from the collection of Captain Belcher. Annals and Magazine of Natural History ser. 1 11: 16–21, 36–46, 255–257
 Sowerby, G.B III. Jr. (1881). Descriptions of eight new species of shells. Proc. Zool. Soc. Lond. (1881): 635–639
 Salvat, B. & Rives, C. 1975. Coquillages de Polynésie. Tahiti : Papéete Les editions du pacifique, pp. 1–391.
 Cernohorsky, W.O. 1978. Tropical Pacific Marine Shells. Sydney : Pacific Publications 352 pp., 68 pls.
 Röckel, D., Korn, W. & Kohn, A.J. 1995. Manual of the Living Conidae. Volume 1: Indo-Pacific Region. Wiesbaden : Hemmen 517 pp.

External links
 The Conus Biodiversity website
 Cone Shells – Knights of the Sea

terebra
Gastropods described in 1778